Hunter Killer is a 2018 American action thriller film directed by Donovan Marsh, written by Arne Schmidt and Jamie Moss, and based on the 2012 novel Firing Point by Don Keith and George Wallace. The film stars Gerard Butler and Gary Oldman with Michael Nyqvist (in one of his final film roles), Common, Linda Cardellini and Toby Stephens in supporting roles, and follows a submarine crew and a group of United States Navy SEALs who rescue the captured Russian President from a coup.

Hunter Killer was released in the United States on October 26, 2018, by Summit Premiere. A disappointment at the box-office, the film received mixed reviews from critics, who saw it as "an undemanding, by-the-numbers actioner".

Plot 
The U.S.  USS Tampa Bay vanishes while shadowing the Russian  Konek in the Arctic.

At the same time, a Navy SEAL team under the command of Lieutenant Bill Beaman is sent to discreetly observe a Russian naval base in Polyarny, Murmansk Oblast, but their mission is jeopardized when Martinelli, the team's new designated marksman recruit, is injured during the HALO drop. At the base, they witness defense minister, Admiral of the Fleet Dmitriy Durov, conducting a coup d'état and taking Russian president Nikolai Zakarin prisoner, swiftly realizing that Durov intends to trigger a war. Their location is almost discovered by the Russians during a radio intercept check, but the SEALs manage to hide away undetected.  Martinelli is shot in the leg by a Russian officer firing blindly at their hidden location, forcing the team to leave him behind.

Meanwhile, Arkansas discovers the destroyed Tampa Bay, and also finds the sunken Russian submarine Konek damaged in a manner that suggests internal sabotage rather than external attack. They are attacked by another Russian Akula submarine, Volkov, that had been hiding under an iceberg, but are able to destroy the ambusher and rescue Russian survivors from Konek, including its commanding officer, Captain 2nd rank Sergei Andropov.

Back at base, the U.S. government learns about the coup. Admiral Charles Donnegan recommends preparing for war, while Fisk suggests that Arkansas be sent to rendezvous with Beaman's team after they rescue Zakarin. Glass manages to convince the reluctant Andropov to help, and with Andropov's knowledge of the challenging underwater topography and the minefield protecting the base, Glass navigates Arkansas near the base undetected. Meanwhile, Beaman's team rescue Russian Presidential Security Service Agent Oleg, who was previously shot by Durov's men when he was protecting Zakarin. Together they infiltrate the base and succeed in retrieving President Zakarin, but lose Oleg, and two teammates, Devin Hall and Matt Johnstone, in the process. With Martinelli providing sniper cover fire, Beaman delivers the injured president to Arkansass deep-submergence rescue vehicle, then goes back alone for Martinelli, saving him just as he is about to be executed.

As the U.S. and Russian fleets prepare for battle, Arkansas sustains further damage when it is attacked by Andropov's old ship, RFS Yevchenko, a heavily-armed destroyer now commanded by Captain Vlade Sutrev, a member of Durov's conspiracy. Andropov is, however, able to communicate a message to the Yevchenko that President Zakarin is aboard the submarine. When Durov orders his forces at the base to fire missiles at the surfaced Arkansas, Glass refuses to take action, realizing that firing back could start the war he is trying to stop. In the last seconds, Andropov's old crew defy orders and destroy the incoming missiles with their close-in weapon system before they can strike the Arkansas, and subsequently destroy the naval base headquarters with their missiles, killing Durov. With the war averted, Glass docks Arkansas to the Russian naval base to return Zakarin and Andropov's surviving crew to their country. Arkansas picks up Beaman and Martinelli, and travels back to the U.S. with a Russian Navy escort.

Cast

Production 
Relativity Media first purchased the spec script, written by Arne Schmidt and adapted from the novel Firing Point, in 2008. Pierre Morel was in talks to direct. In February 2011, Variety reported that Phillip Noyce was hired to direct the film. John Kolvenbach and Jamie Moss provided rewrites to the script; the latter's rewrites was what interested Noyce to direct. Production was set to begin at the end of the year before Noyce left the project, citing similarities between other films that he previously helmed, and moved on to films like Above Suspicion. Antoine Fuqua was later hired to replace him, and a release date was set for December 21, 2012. Gerard Butler was cast as Joe Glass and Sam Worthington was considered for Bill Beaman. Fuqua and Butler later left production to work on Olympus Has Fallen, and the film remained in development hell as directors like McG and Steven Quale passed on the film. Gerard Butler eventually returned to the film as Martin Campbell was chosen to direct. Common and Billy Bob Thornton were added to the cast, and Peter Craig provided uncredited rewrites.

On November 12, 2015, it was announced that a deal between producers of the film had been made, that Relativity, Neal H. Moritz, and Toby Jaffe's Original Film would now produce the film along with Millennium Films, which would also co-finance and distribute. On March 3, 2016, it was announced that Donovan Marsh would direct the film and Gerard Butler and Gary Oldman would star, with Original Film's Neal H. Moritz and Toby Jaffe producing the film along with Butler, Tooley Productions' Tucker Tooley, Alan Siegel, and Millennium's Mark Gill, John Thompson, Matt O'Toole and Les Weldon. On June 23, 2016, Taylor John Smith was cast in the film to play a sonar man on the sub. On July 6, 2016, Gabriel Chavarria joined the film to play a Navy SEAL aboard the U.S. submarine, next day, Zane Holtz also joined the film to play "Martinelli," a brave and skilled member of the elite unit. On July 13, 2016, Michael Trucco and Ryan McPartlin also came aboard to play a weapons specialist Devin Hall, and an ex-SEAL and CIA medic Matt Johnstone, respectively. On July 19, 2016, Michael Nyqvist was added to the cast to play Captain Sergei Andropov. On July 21, 2016, David Gyasi joined the film to play the Chief of the Boat of the submarine USS Omaha, with Toby Stephens cast to play Lt. Beaman, head of the black ops squad. On August 4, 2016, Linda Cardellini joined the cast.

Principal photography on the film began on July 25, 2016, in London, and in Bulgaria. Interior sets of a Virginia-class Hunter Killer submarine were built at Ealing Studios, using blueprints approved by the U.S. Navy, with the spaces expanded slightly to allow freer camera movement. The sets were mounted on a gimbal to simulate the movement of the sea. Ealing also hosted a Pentagon set from where U.S. military personnel track the submarine action.

Although the heroes of the movie are portrayed as U.S Navy SEALs the costuming department for the movie used commercially available uniforms in A-TACS FG camouflage which is not a pattern in use by the U.S Navy.

An exterior set of the main Hunter Killer submarine was built in Pinewood Studios’ 806,000-gallon exterior water tank, while underwater scenes were shot using a separate water tank at Warner Bros. Studios, Leavesden, also just outside London. Interiors of the Russian base were built as sets at Nu Boyana Film Studios in Bulgarian capital, Sofia.

Release
The film was released in the United States on October 26, 2018, by Lionsgate through the Summit Premiere label. It was released in several territories, including the United Kingdom, the week before on October 19, 2018.

In Ukraine, the film was scheduled to premiere on October 25, but the Ukraine Ministry of Culture denied it an exhibition license based on a 2012 law on cinematography that banned "the distribution and screening of films, the goal of which is to popularise the bodies of an aggressor state and/or Soviet state security organs". According to a representative of the Ukrainian State Film Agency (Derzhkino), screening the film would be illegal because it contains a "positive image of the Russian president and admiral of the Russian army". Ukrainian-Russian relations have deteriorated since the 2014 Russian annexation of Crimea.

In Russia, the film was scheduled to premiere on November 1, but the film failed to obtain an exhibition license from the culture ministry. The ministry stated that the copy of the movie submitted by the distributor for review was of poor quality and the replacement was submitted too late for the ministry to review it in time.

Home media
Hunter Killer was released on digital on January 15, 2019, and on Ultra HD Blu-ray, Blu-ray and DVD on January 29, 2019, by Lionsgate Home Entertainment.

Reception

Box office
Hunter Killer grossed $15.8 million in the United States and Canada, and $15.9 million in other territories, for a total worldwide gross of $31.7 million.

In the United States and Canada, Hunter Killer was released alongside Indivisible and Johnny English Strikes Again, and was projected to gross $5–9 million from 2,720 theaters in its opening weekend. The film made $2.6 million on its first day, including $420,000 from Thursday night previews. It went on to debut to $6.7 million, finishing fifth at the box office and marking the worst debut for Butler since Playing for Keeps ($5.8 million) in 2012. The film made $3.5 million in its second weekend, falling to ninth.

Critical response
The website's critical consensus reads, "Much like the submarine in its story, Hunter Killer cruises the murky action depths, following a perfunctory course into territory that's been charted many times before." On Metacritic, the film has a weighted average score of 43 out of 100, based on 28 critics, indicating "mixed or average reviews". Audiences polled by CinemaScore gave the film an average grade of "A−" on an A+ to F scale, while PostTrak reported filmgoers gave it 4 out of 5 stars.

Bilge Ebiri of Vulture.com wrote: Hunter Killer won’t win any awards for originality, but it may win a couple for the brazenness with which it stacks clichés upon clichés. Basically, it’s Crimson Tide meets Lone Survivor meets Under Siege meets a Russian variation on Olympus Has Fallen, with a bit of Geostorm thrown in. At least three of those movies are pretty good, so the overall math works in the film’s favor."
Norman Wilner of Toronto's Now accused Marsh for ripping off John McTiernan's The Hunt For Red October and stated that "The constant agitation and bone-deep respect for all things military is straight out of Clancy’s playbook, but there’s no Jack Ryan figure to humanize it all."

References

External links 
 
 

American action thriller films
2018 action thriller films
Submarine films
Films about fictional presidents of the United States
Films about terrorism
Films based on American novels
Films based on thriller novels
Films produced by Neal H. Moritz
Films set in Polyarny, Murmansk Oblast
Films set in Scotland
Films set in Washington, D.C.
Films set in the White House
Films shot at Pinewood Studios
Films shot at Warner Bros. Studios, Leavesden
Films shot in Bulgaria
Films shot in London
Films with screenplays by Jamie Moss
Original Film films
Techno-thriller films
Military of Russia in films
Films about coups d'état
Films set in the Arctic
Film controversies in Russia
Film censorship in Ukraine
Film controversies in Ukraine
2010s English-language films
2010s American films